They Knew Mr. Knight is a 1946 British drama film directed by Norman Walker and starring Mervyn Johns, Nora Swinburne and Joyce Howard. It was based on a 1934 novel of the same title by Dorothy Whipple. A man is sentenced to twelve months in Lincoln jail following his involvement in a share scam, plunging himself and his family into despair. However, by the time of his release he is able to face his uncertain future with fortitude.

The film was made by Norman Walker's G.H.W. Productions, funded by the Rank Organisation, at Denham Studios. It suffered a financial loss on its release and it was the last of four films that Walker made for Rank.

Cast

Critical reception
The Radio Times gave the film two out of five stars, and wrote, "director Norman Walker rather wallows in this glum middle-class morality tale. But he prudently cashes in on Johns's fretful features and the solid support provided by Nora Swinburne and Joan Greenwood, as his wife and self-sacrificing daughter."

References

Bibliography
 Murphy, Robert. Realism and Tinsel: Cinema and Society in Britain 1939-48. Routledge, 1992.

External links

Film review at Variety

1946 films
1946 drama films
British drama films
1940s English-language films
Films directed by Norman Walker
Films set in Lincolnshire
Films based on British novels
Films set in London
Films shot at Denham Film Studios
British black-and-white films
1940s British films